The Ibn Battuta Mall is a large shopping mall on the Sheikh Zayed Road in Dubai, UAE, close to Interchange 6 for Jebel Ali Village.

Overview
On 26 May 2013, Nakheel announced the tender for Ibn Battuta Mall expansion – a new,  retail hub for another 150 shops. This expansion had introduced new shops in the mall, such as Decathlon, Brands for Less, and includes a new food court in the upgraded metro link. The mall contains several activities such as a trampoline park, a light exhibition, the Carrefour hypermarket and a 21-screen cinema theatre by Novo cinemas. 

The mall consists of six courts, each of whose designs are inspired by some of the countries visited by the Moroccan Berber explorer, Ibn Battuta: Andalusia Court, China Court, Egypt Court, India Court, Persia Court, and Tunisia Court. The India Court features a working reproduction of an elephant clock.

The mall is located next to the neighbourhood of The Gardens, and near the Delhi Private School and the Winchester School. Thus, the mall is visited frequently by residents as well as school students. The eponymous Ibn Battuta metro station on the Dubai Metro provides access from central Dubai.

In the recent year, Ibn Battuta Mall has open new shops and businesses including a brand-new nursery concept by Jumeirah International Nurseries and a new walk-in-retail store for Eros Group.

Persia Court

Gallery

See also
 Ibn Battuta (1304–1368/9), a Muslim Moroccan scholar and explorer
 Ibn Battuta (Dubai Metro) station

References

External links

 Ibn Battuta Mall official website

2005 establishments in the United Arab Emirates
Shopping malls established in 2005
Shopping malls in Dubai
Nakheel Properties